Mary Ann Township is one of the 25 townships of Licking County, Ohio, United States. As of the 2010 census, the population was 2,116.

Geography
Located in the northeastern part of the county, it borders the following townships:
Eden Township - north
Fallsbury Township - northeast corner
Perry Township - east
Madison Township - south
Newark Township - southwest corner
Newton Township - west

No municipalities are located in Mary Ann Township.

Name and history
It is the only Mary Ann Township statewide.

Government
The township is governed by a three-member board of trustees, who are elected in November of odd-numbered years to a four-year term beginning on the following January 1. Two are elected in the year after the presidential election and one is elected in the year before it. There is also an elected township fiscal officer, who serves a four-year term beginning on April 1 of the year after the election, which is held in November of the year before the presidential election. Vacancies in the fiscal officership or on the board of trustees are filled by the remaining trustees.

References

External links
County website

Townships in Licking County, Ohio
Townships in Ohio